Marco is a 1973 American-Japanese historical musical adventure film directed by Seymour Robbie and starring Desi Arnaz Jr., Jack Weston and Zero Mostel, which depicts the 13th century journey of Italian merchant and explorer Marco Polo along the Silk Road and his meeting with Kublai Khan.

It has been described as unreleased in the United States., released as a television movie, or as a theatrical release.

On December 9, 1972, Arnaz appeared on The Tonight Show with Johnny Carson to promote the film. His romantic partner Liza Minnelli had traveled to Tokyo with him during the filming.

Plot

Cast
 Desi Arnaz Jr. as Marco Polo
 Jack Weston as Maffio Polo 
 Zero Mostel as Kublai Khan 
 Cie Cie Win as Aigiarm 
 Aimee Eccles as Kuklatoi 
 Fred Sadoff as Niccolo Polo 
 Mafumi Sakamoto as Letanpoing 
 Tetsu Nakamura as Sea Captain 
 Van Christie as Chontosai 
 Osamu Okawa as Ling Su 
 Masumi Okada as Ti Wai 
 Romeo Muller as Pitai Brahmas 
 Yuka Kamebuchi as Mme. Tung 
 Ikio Sawamura as Lomar

References

Bibliography
 Jerry Roberts. Encyclopedia of Television Film Directors. Scarecrow Press, 2009.

External links

Getty Images: Behind the Scenes photograph of Arnaz and children near Tokyo

1973 films
1970s historical adventure films
Japanese historical adventure films
American historical adventure films
English-language Japanese films
Films directed by Seymour Robbie
Cinerama Releasing Corporation films
1970s musical films
American musical films
Films set in the 13th century
Japanese musical films
Films with screenplays by Romeo Muller
Rankin/Bass Productions films
1970s English-language films
1970s American films